Mignot is a surname of French origin. People with the name include:

Aimé Mignot (b. 1932), French professional football player and coach
Claudine Françoise Mignot (1624–1711), French adventuress
C.B.G. Mignot a French toy soldier manufacturer from 1825
Jean-Pascal Mignot (b. 1981), French professional football player
Marie Louise Mignot (a.k.a. Madame Denis) (1712–1790), French woman who was the niece and heiress of Voltaire
Suzanne Le Mignot (b. 1970), American television news anchor and reporter in Chicago
Théonie Rivière Mignot (1819-1875), American restaurateur